Elk Mountain is a town in Carbon County, Wyoming, United States.  The population was 191 at the 2010 census. The town shares its name with a mountain  to its southwest.

Geography
Elk Mountain is located at  (41.686517, −106.414535).

Climate

Demographics

2010 census
As of the census of 2010, there were 191 people, 76 households, and 58 families residing in the town. The racial makeup of the town was 98.4% White, 1.0% African American, and 0.5% Native American. Hispanic or Latino of any race were 0.5% of the population.

There were 76 households, of which 28.9% had children under the age of 18 living with them, 72.4% were married couples living together, 1.3% had a female householder with no husband present, 2.6% had a male householder with no wife present, and 23.7% were non-families. 23.7% of all households were made up of individuals, and 13.2% had someone living alone who was 65 years of age or older. The average household size was 2.51 and the average family size was 2.95.

The median age in the town was 45.1 years. 20.4% of residents were under the age of 18; 6.4% were between the ages of 18 and 24; 23.1% were from 25 to 44; 32% were from 45 to 64; and 18.3% were 65 years of age or older. The gender makeup of the town was 49.2% male and 50.8% female.

2000 census

As of the census of 2000, there were 192 people, 74 households, and 52 families residing in the town. The population density was 676.5 people per square mile (264.8/km2). There were 116 housing units at an average density of 408.7 per square mile (160.0/km2). The racial makeup of the town was 95.83% White, 1.04% Native American, 2.08% from other races, and 1.04% from two or more races. Hispanic or Latino of any race were 5.21% of the population.

There were 74 households, out of which 35.1% had children under the age of 18 living with them, 63.5% were married couples living together, 5.4% had a female householder with no husband present, and 29.7% were non-families. 28.4% of all households were made up of individuals, and 14.9% had someone living alone who was 65 years of age or older. The average household size was 2.59 and the average family size was 3.17.

In the town, the population was spread out, with 30.2% under the age of 18, 4.2% from 18 to 24, 26.0% from 25 to 44, 25.5% from 45 to 64, and 14.1% who were 65 years of age or older. The median age was 36 years. For every 100 females, there were 120.7 males. For every 100 females age 18 and over, there were 106.2 males.

The median income for a household in the town was $40,313, and the median income for a family was $46,042. Males had a median income of $27,500 versus $23,125 for females. The per capita income for the town was $14,463. None of the families and 4.3% of the population were living below the poverty line, including no under eighteens and 14.3% of those over 64.

Education
Public education in the town of Elk Mountain is provided by Carbon County School District #2. Zoned campuses include Elk Mountain Elementary School (grades K-6) and H.E.M. Junior/Senior High School  (grades 7–12).

Elk Mountain has a public library, a branch of the Carbon County Library System.

Government

Elk Mountain's current system of government is mayor-council government. 4 council members are headed by the office of the Mayor. The current mayor of the town is Morgan Irene (Republican) whom took office in early January 2011 with a narrow victory against Rick Christopherson.

List of Former/Current Mayors

1. Barbara Bonner (Republican)/ In office from 1994 to 2007

2. Rick Christopherson (Democrat)/ In office from 2007 to 2011

3. Morgan Irene (Republican)/ In office from 2011–present

References

Towns in Carbon County, Wyoming
Towns in Wyoming